Beat the Whites with the Red Wedge is a 1919 lithographic Bolshevik propaganda poster by El Lissitzky. In the poster, the intrusive red wedge symbolizes the Bolsheviks, who are penetrating and defeating their opponents, the White movement, during the Russian Civil War.

The image became popular in the West when Lissitzky moved to Germany in 1921. It is considered symbolic of the Russian Civil War in Western publications. It is often used in album art and in advertisement.

History 

Beat the Whites with the Red Wedge is one the most famous work by Lissitzky. Lissitzky made it in 1919, when Russia was going through a civil war, which was mainly fought between the "Reds" (communists, socialists and revolutionaries) and the "Whites" (monarchists, conservatives, liberals and other socialists who opposed the Bolshevik Revolution). The name can also be derived from antisemitic pogrom slogan "Beat the Jews!" ("Bej zhidov!" ). According to Sophie Lissitzky-Küppers, in 1945 Pablo Picasso declared that the "painting was not invented for decorating houses, but as a weapon of attack and defence".

Art historian Maria Elena Versari connected Lissitzky's poster with Italian Futurism manifesto Futurist Synthesis of War, published in 20,000 copies in 1914, and signed by Filippo Tommaso Marinetti, Umberto Boccioni, Carlo Carrà, Luigi Russolo, and Ugo Piatti. Lissitzky never mentioned the manifesto, but his friend and colleague Malevich met Marinetti in 1914, and even called him one of the "two pillars, the two 'prisms' of the new art of the twentieth century". Malevich was also well aware of the Italian Futurists works and of Boccioni's theories. In 1916–1917 Malevich, together with artists Alexandra Exter and Olga Rozanova, published two issues of a journal about Cubism and Futurism. Later, in 1918, Malevich wrote: "Cubism and Futurism are the revolutionary banners of art". Also in 1918, young architect Nikolai Kolli created The Red Wedge monument in Moscow. It "consisted of a red triangle vertically inserted as a wedge into a white rectangular block. A very visible crack snakes downward from the tip of the triangle, suggesting that the force of the red wedge has succeeded in breaking the solidity of the white structure. The abstract metaphor was intended to signify the victory of the Red Army over the White, counter-Revolutionary forces." The monument initially was erected as a symbol of victory over White general Pyotr Krasnov, an important early triump of the Red Army. Versari argues that Lissitzky "adopted an almost identical language" for his Beat the Whites with the Red Wedge, though he never mentioned it.

Lissitzky later used similar idea, a wedge in a circle, for a cover of Yiddish magazine Apikojres ('Atheist'). As Artur Kamczycki writes, "Apikojres is a heretic – a Jew who does not believe in revelation and negates traditional religion and will therefore not have a share in the world to come and is bound for eternal damnation. In Yiddish, this word is often used to describe someone who has opinions that contradict the orthodox doctrine. Lissitzky suggests here that a revolution requires sacrifice and transformations in the name of the new, better world." He also noted that Lissitzky believed in the forces of Revolution and combined it with a messianic elements of Judaism, writing:
The educated were expecting the 'new era' to arrive in the shape of a Messiah ... mounted on a white horse. But ... it came in the shape of Russian Ivan ...in tattered and dirty clothes, barefoot ... only the youngest generation recognized this [...].

Modern use 
The Slabinja Monument to the fallen fighters and victims of WWII fascism from Slabinja, Croatia, seems to be directly inspired by this poster.

English doom metal band Witchfinder General employ the red wedge motif in the artwork accompanying their 1982 EP Soviet Invasion, and The Wake used the artwork for their twelve-inch single "Something Outside" in 1983. A similar simplified version (rotated 1/4 turn clockwise) was appropriated by the German post-punk band Mekanik Destruktiw Komandoh (MDK) for their 1983 12" single "Berlin", released on the sixth international label.

Several German-speaking Marxist organizations are using a simplified version of the poster for their logo, among them the German/Austrian/Swiss section of the International Marxist Tendency ("Der Funke") and "Gruppen gegen Kapital und Nation".

Franz Ferdinand used the image as inspiration for the cover of their single "This Fire".

The logo and the name was used by a socialist music and arts organisation in the UK, Red Wedge, which campaigned against the Thatcher government in the lead up to the 1987 general election.

The Russian artist Sergei Bugaev produced an "Anti-Lissitzky" series between 1991 and 1995 which included several derivative works based on "Beat the Whites with the Red Wedge".

Belarusian football team FC Vitebsk released a kit featuring the image in 2020.

The poster was drawn as hanging on a wall in a 1995 poster created by Gabor Baksay.

In September 2021, a modified version of this painting was used in Novosibirsk to promote vaccination against the COVID-19.

Lissitzky's Revenge is a game based on Lissitzky's propaganda posters from 1919. It was developed in 2015 and uses paper-cuts as a medium. In the game "you play as the red wedge and must recreate its violent assault on the white circle to complete each level".

References

Sources 

 
 
 
 
 

1919 works
Russian Civil War
Propaganda in the Soviet Union
Soviet art
Propaganda posters
Suprematism (art movement)